Ronald "Ronnie" Zito (born February 17, 1939) is an American jazz drummer.

Early life 
Zito was born in Utica, New York, into a musical family including his brother Torrie Zito. He began playing drums at the age of 10 and at age 14 took a year and a half of formal lessons.

Career 
Zito was the Bobby Darin's personal drummer for four years. He also played with Woody Herman, J.R. Monterose, Frank Rosolino, Peggy Lee, Cher, Roberta Flack and Eartha Kitt.

Collaborations 
With David Pomeranz
 New Blues (Decca Records, 1971)

With Barry Manilow
 This One's for You (Arista Records, 1976)
 Even Now (Arista Records, 1978)
 Barry (Arista Records, 1980)

With Irene Cara
 Anyone Can See (Network, 1982)

With Frankie Valli
 Closeup (Private Stock Records, 1975)

With Bobby Darin
 Love Swings (Atco Records, 1961)
 Winners (Atco Records, 1964)

With Roberta Flack
 Feel Like Makin' Love (Atlantic Records, 1975)

With Jake Holmes
 How Much Time (Columbia Records, 1972)

With Cher
 Take Me Home (Casablanca Records, 1979)

With Don McLean
 Playin' Favorites (United Artists Records, 1973)

References 

American jazz drummers
1939 births
Living people
musicians from Utica, New York